Monica Dominique (née Danielsson, born 20 July 1940 in Västerås) is a Swedish pianist, composer,  and actress.

As a student Monica Dominique attended the Adolf Fredrik's Music School in Stockholm. She was educated at the Royal College of Music, Stockholm, and has been active as a versatile but mainly jazz musician since the 1960s. In the early 1970s, she played in the group Solar Plexus. She started her career as an actress in 1969, playing the character Lotten in the TV movie Spader, Madame. She continued her acting career well into the late 1990s.

She and her husband, pianist and composer Carl-Axel Dominique, composed the song "You're Summer" for the Swedish group Nova to perform at the Eurovision Song Contest in Luxembourg in 1973, which she also conducted herself. The Dominique couple often perform together, playing piano four hands.

Her brother is the jazz musician Palle Danielsson.

Discography

Albums
1988: Inside the Rainbow 
1996: En flygel – fyra händer with Carl-Axel Dominique
1997: So Nice with Carol Rogers
2000: Mitt i mej 
2003: Bird Woman (as Monica Dominique Quintet)
2004: Säg vad ni vill... men först kommer käket with Monica Nielsen
2006: Jösses flickor – Återkomsten
2009: Monica & Monica tolkar Beppe, Olle, Allan with Monica Nielsen
2011: Fingers Unlimited with Carl-Axel Dominique
2012: Togetherness with Palle Danielsson

Filmography
1979: Repmånad
1979: Linus eller Tegelhusets hemlighet
1980: Räkan från Maxim (TV) 
1981: Höjdhoppar'n
1982: Gräsänklingar
1990: Macken – Roy's & Roger's Bilservice
1996: Monopol

Soundtracks
1970: Förpassad
1970: Jänken
1983: Med Lill-Klas i kappsäcken (TV)
1983: Kärleken
1991: Sanna kvinnor (TV) 
1996: Alla dagar, alla nätter (TV)

References

External links
 Dominique Musik

Swedish film actresses
Swedish jazz pianists
Swedish women pianists
Swedish pianists
Swedish jazz composers
Eurovision Song Contest conductors
1940 births
Living people
Swedish women composers
Women jazz composers
20th-century Swedish musicians
20th-century Swedish actresses
Royal College of Music, Stockholm alumni
20th-century conductors (music)
21st-century pianists
Women classical pianists
20th-century women pianists
21st-century women pianists